Map Ta Phut is a town (thesaban mueang) in Rayong Province, Thailand. It is the site of Thailand's largest industrial park, the Map Ta Phut Industrial Estate. Provincial offices are in Map Ta Phut.

Geography
The town covers parts of the sub-districts Noen Phra and Thap Ma, the whole sub-districts Huai Pong and Map Tha Phut of Mueang Rayong District, and parts of Map Kha sub-district in Nikhom Phatthana District.

History
In 1962, the sanitary district (sukhaphiban) Map Tha Phut was created as the first local government of the settlement. In 1991 it was upgraded to a sub-district municipality (thesaban tambon), and in 2001 to a town.

According to the World Resources Institute, Map Ta Phut is "...one of Thailand's most toxic hot spots with a history of air and water pollution, industrial accidents, illegal hazardous waste dumping, and pollution-related health impacts including cancer and birth deformities."

References

External links
Map Ta Phut Municipality (Thai)

Populated places in Rayong province